Hartola is a municipality of Finland. It is located in the Itä-Häme, Päijänne Tavastia region. The municipality has a population of 
(), which make it the smallest municipality in Päijänne Tavastia in terms of population.
which 
is water. The population density is
. Neighbouring municipalities are Heinola, Joutsa, Luhanka, Pertunmaa and Sysmä.

The municipality is unilingually Finnish. The municipality is also known as "Gustav Adolfs" in Swedish. Hartola is home to the Itä-Hämeen Museo, the regional museum for seven municipalities.

Since 1987, the town has billed itself as a sovereign royal parish based upon a 1784 proclamation by King Gustav III of Sweden creating a new parish on the eastern border of his kingdom in honor of his son, Gustav Adolf.

At every first Saturday in September, there is a fair at Hartola. The event is biggest in Finland at its genre.

The municipality is also known as the writer Maila Talvio's place of birth.

History
Hartola may have been mentioned as early as 1398 (ut ecclesia parrochialis Hartola Aboensis dioceses), however this may have also referred to Hattula. It was originally a part of the parish of Sysmä. At least between 1540 and 1729, it was called Koskipää, after which the name Hartola appears again.

Hartola became an independent parish in 1784. It was also granted the Swedish name Gustav Adolfs. In Finnish, the parish was also known as Kustavus, Kustavuksenpitäjä and Kustaanpitäjä, but the name Hartola was still in use. By the late 1800s, Hartola had become the sole name for the parish.

Joutsa was a part of Hartola until 1860, while Leivonmäki was a part of Hartola until 1880.

Politics
Results of the 2011 Finnish parliamentary election in Hartola:

Centre Party   26.2%
National Coalition Party   23.0%
Social Democratic Party   18.5%
True Finns   17.9%
Christian Democrats   6.3%
Left Alliance   5.0%
Green League   1.6%

Villages

Hangastaipale
Kalho, writer Mika Waltari wrote The Egyptian here.
Koitti
Kuivajärvi
Kumu
Lepsala
Murakka
Nokka
Putkijärvi
Siltasuo
Vuorenkylä  is a northernmost village in Päijänne Tavastia

All schools those located in villages have been closed. School system in Hartola is about 140 years old.

References

External links

Municipality of Hartola – Official website, finnish, english
Itä-Hämeen Museo

Hartola, Finland
Populated places established in 1784